Kim Edberg Andersen (born 21 June 1973) is a Danish politician and a Member of the Folketing representing The New Right party since 2022. 

Edberg completed a degree in business studies at Aalborg University. He was a member of the Danish People's Party and had been a councilor for the party in Rebild Municipality and stood as a candidate for the DPP during the 2019 Danish general election before resigning in 2021. He joined the New Right the same year and was elected to the Folketing in the 2022 Danish general election for the North Jutland constituency.

References

1973 births
Living people
Danish People's Party politicians
The New Right (Denmark) politicians
Danish municipal councillors
Members of the Folketing 2022–2026